Eduardo D. P. De Robertis (11 December 1913 – 31 May 1988) was an Argentine physician and biologist. He had a long and prolific scientific career, and was a co-discoverer of cell microtubules in 1953.

De Robertis was the son of an Italian immigrant and his son Edward M. De Robertis is also a noted biologist.

In 1981, De Robertis became a founding member of the World Cultural Council.

References

1913 births
1988 deaths
Argentine people of Italian descent
20th-century Argentine physicians
Argentine biologists
Founding members of the World Cultural Council
20th-century biologists